Peringueyella is a genus of bush crickets in the subfamily Saginae with species found in Africa.

Species 

The following species are recognised in the genus Peringueyella:

 Peringueyella jocosa Saussure, 1888
 Peringueyella macrocephala (Schaum, 1853)
 Peringueyella rentzi Kaltenbach, 1981
 Peringueyella zulu Kaltenbach, 1971

References 

Tettigoniidae